Vladimir Veličković (born 3 March 1989) is a Serbian professional basketball player.

Playing career 
A point guard, Veličković played for Vojvodina Srbijagas, MZT Skopje (Macedonia), Konstantin, Baník Handlová (Slovakia), Tamiš, Zlatibor, Dynamic, and Zdravlje.

References

External links
 Eurobasket profile
 RealGM profile
 Proballers profile

1989 births
Living people
Basketball League of Serbia players
KK Dynamic players
KK MZT Skopje players
KK Zlatibor players
KK Zdravlje players
KK Vojvodina Srbijagas players
KK Tamiš players
OKK Konstantin players
MBK Handlová players
Serbian men's basketball players
Serbian expatriate basketball people in North Macedonia
Serbian expatriate basketball people in Slovakia
Point guards